Mamuka Khazaradze (born 29 December 1966) is a Georgian businessman who co-founded the largest Georgian universal bank, JSC TBC Bank in 1992. In 2019, he moved into politics, setting up a political movement Lelo for Georgia.

Early life and education
He graduated from Tbilisi Technical University in 1988 and also holds an executive degree from Harvard Business School, where he studied during 1998–2000. In 2014, Khazaradze was awarded EY Entrepreneur of the Year in Georgia – the first such award to a Georgian business.

He was awarded the Presidential Order of Excellence in 2010.

TBC Bank Group PLC and JSC TBC Bank 
JSC TBC Bank completed its London Stock Exchange IPO in June 2014, raising US$256 million and listing 40% of the Bank's shares. The IPO valued the Bank at US$640 million. The Bank listed its UK-incorporated holding parent company, TBC Bank Group PLC on the Premium Segment of the London Stock Exchange in 2016 and joined the FTSE 250 index in 2017.

Other Ventures and Projects

Lelo for Georgia 
In December 2019, Khazaradze together with other prominent Georgian politicians set up Lelo for Georgia, a party that seeks to contest parliamentary elections in Georgia in October 2020.

Anaklia Port 
Anaklia Port is a project to build a deep-sea port in Western Georgia, to accommodate very large vessels – the first of its kind in the region. According to the research published by NATO Research Division, Georgia's strategic geographic location gives is vast potential to act as a key transit country facilitating high volumes of international trade between Europe and Asia.

IDS Borjomi International 
IDS Borjomi was founded in 1995 by Mamuka Khazaradze and his business partners, building on the Borjomi mineral waters brand that was well known throughout the Soviet Union. IDS Borjomi Georgia now exports to over 40 countries worldwide.

Guivy Zaldastanishvili American Academy in Tbilisi (GZAAT) 
GZAAT is one of the first, private high-school providing Georgian students with world-class education co-founded in 2001 by Guivy Zaldastanishvili, with support from Mamuka Khazaradze and other Georgian entrepreneurs. Mamuka Khazaradze currently serves on the Board of Trustee of GZAAT.

Chateau Mukhrani 
Chateau Mukhrani is an old royal Georgian winery that first exported Georgian wines 130 years ago. The modern company, Chateau Mukhrani was founded in 2002 by Mamuka Khazaradze and Badri Japaridze and their business partners.

Trial

A criminal charge was filed against Khazaradze and his business partner, alleging that they were involved in money-laundering, after he announced formation of Lelo for Georgia. It was deemed as an attack on political pluralism in Georgia. In 2022, the Tbilisi City Court found Mamuka Khazaradze, Badri Japaridze and Avtandil Tsereteli – initially charged with money-laundering – guilty of fraud and sentenced them to seven years of prison. However, they were not subject to imprisonment as the statute of limitations had already expired by the time of the ruling.

References 

1966 births
Living people
Businesspeople from Tbilisi
Recipients of the Presidential Order of Excellence